A conveyor system transports materials from one place to another.

Conveyor may also refer to:
 Conveyor (sternwheeler)
 Conveyor (band), an American art rock band
 Conveyor belt
 Conveyor belt ski lift
 Conveyor belt sushi
 Chain conveyor
 Lineshaft roller conveyor
 "Conveyor", a 2015 song by AKB48 from Koko ga Rhodes da, Koko de Tobe!
 "Conveyor", a 2020 song by Moses Sumney from Græ

See also
 
 
 Conveyance (disambiguation)

ru:Конвейер